Espejo is a canton of Ecuador, located in Carchi Province. Its capital is the town of El Ángel. Its population in the 2001 census was 13,515 and in the 2010 census was 13,364.
 
Espejo canton contains the parishes of El Ángel (Anhil), El Goaltal, La Libertad (Alizo), and San Isidro.

Demographics
Ethnic groups as of the Ecuadorian census of 2010:
Mestizo  95.1%
White  2.1%
Afro-Ecuadorian  1.4%
Indigenous  1.0%
Montubio  0.4%
Other  0.0%

References

Cantons of Carchi Province